The Pedagogical State: Education and the Politics of National Culture in Post-1980 Turkey (2006) is a Stanford University Press book by anthropologist Sam Kaplan about influences on Turkiye's educational curriculum, based on fieldwork in the village of Yayla.

See also 
 Education
 Pedagogy

References

Education in Turkey
Stanford University Press books
2006 non-fiction books
Books about education
Anthropology books